Alina Sergeyevna Litvinenko (born 17 December 1995) is a Kyrgyzstani football striker currently playing for BIIK Kazygurt in the Kazakhstani Championship. She made her Champions League debut in August 2012, scoring a hat-trick against Pärnu JK.

She is a founding member of the Kyrzygstani national team. On April 27, 2009, in just her second international game, she scored a hat-trick in a 4–1 win against Palestine in the 2010 Asian Cup's qualification. At the age of 13 years, 131 days, she became the youngest goalscorer in international football history.

References

External links
 Alina Litvinenko at Eurosport

1995 births
Living people
Kyrgyzstani women's footballers
Expatriate women's footballers in Kazakhstan
Place of birth missing (living people)
Kyrgyzstani expatriate footballers
BIIK Kazygurt players
Kyrgyzstani people of Russian descent
Kyrgyzstani expatriate sportspeople in Kazakhstan
Women's association football forwards
Kyrgyzstan women's international footballers